Nieznanice  is a village in the administrative district of Gmina Kłomnice, within Częstochowa County, Silesian Voivodeship, in southern Poland.

Population 
The village has a population of 611.

References

Nieznanice